Jabal Ferwa' is a mountain in Saudi Arabia located near 27° 50' 27" N 38° 06' 41" E, northwest of Tayma, Saudi Arabia.

References

Ferwa
Geology of Saudi Arabia